Doğa Schools or legally İTÜ ETA Foundation Doğa Schools after the 2020 acquisition is a chain of private schools in Turkey. The chain owns nearly 100 schools in the chain, over 20 of which are in Istanbul.

History
The first Doğa School was opened in 2002 in Beykoz, a forested area on the northeastern outskirts of Istanbul. The founders, led by former chemistry teacher, Fethi Şimsek. 

Fetih Şimsek had a background in running chains of preparatory schools for high school and university entrance exams, and English Time, a chain of English language courses.

Controversies
In 2019, the teachers that worked in several different Doğa Schools protested because of the upper management having delayed paying the teachers salaries for amounts of time varying from one month to up to five. 

The ownership at the time had mismanaged the finances of the company and no longer had the money to keep the schools running. For this reason, in 2020, Istanbul Technical University bought the school chain for 12 million TL. The school chain would later include the Istanbul Technical University ownership status in its advertising.

References and notes

External links
Website

High schools in Istanbul
Private schools in Turkey
2002 establishments in Turkey
Beykoz
Educational institutions established in 2002